The Stockton Millers were a minor league baseball team located in Stockton, California. They competed primarily in the California League between 1886 and 1915.

External links
Baseball Reference

Defunct California League teams
Defunct California State League teams
Defunct Pacific Coast League teams
Defunct California Players League teams
Baseball teams established in 1886
Baseball teams disestablished in 1915
Defunct baseball teams in California
1886 establishments in California
1915 disestablishments in California